The 2014 NCAA Women's Gymnastics Championship was held in Birmingham, Alabama, on April 18–20, 2014. Gymnasts from the six regional meets advanced to the NCAA Division I national team and individual competitions. The team competition was won by Florida and Oklahoma.

Regional Championships
The Regional Championships was held on April 5, 2014, at the following six sites:
 Athens Regional (host: Georgia) – 1. Michigan 196.750; 2. Georgia 196.375; 3. Central Michigan 195.600; 4. Ohio State 195.100; 5. North Carolina State 194.550; 6. Rutgers 193.750
 Baton Rouge Regional (host: LSU) – 1. LSU 198.325; 2. Stanford 197.275; 3. Iowa State 196.350; 4. Kent State 195.125; 5. Auburn 195.050; 6. Arizona 194.825
 Fayetteville Regional (host: Arkansas) – 1. Utah 197.300; 2. UCLA 196.600; 3. Arkansas 196.375; 4. Arizona State Univ. 194.425; 5. UC Davis 193.900; 6. Utah State 191.875
 Minneapolis Regional (host: Minnesota) – 1. Oklahoma 197.725; 2. Illinois 196.600; 3. Minnesota 196.350; 4. California 195.700; 5. Southern Utah 195.150; 6. San Jose State 193.950 
 Seattle Regional (host: Washington) – 1. Alabama 197.550; 2. Nebraska 196.975; 3. Denver 195.625; 4. Washington 195.550; 5. Boise State 195.275; 6. Brigham Young 194.650
 State College Regional (host: Penn State) – 1. Florida 197.050; 2. Penn State 196.725; 3. Oregon State 196.525; 4. Kentucky 195.925; 5. New Hampshire 195.025; 6. Maryland 194.525

NCAA Women's Gymnastics Championship
The NCAA Women's Gymnastics Championship were held in Birmingham–Jefferson Convention Complex, Birmingham, Alabama, on Friday, April 18, 2014.
 Afternoon session (1 p.m. CST) –  Oklahoma (197.500), Georgia (197.300), LSU (197.100), Stanford (196.600), Michigan (196.425), Illinois (195.800)
 Evening session (7 p.m. CST) – Alabama & Florida (197.650), Nebraska (197.100), UCLA (197.050), Utah (197.025), Penn State (194.825)

NCAA Championship (Super Six Finals)
NCAA Championship (Super Six Finals): Birmingham–Jefferson Convention Complex, Birmingham, Alabama, on Saturday, April 19, 2014. (6 p.m. CST) - 
 Team - Florida & Oklahoma (198.175), LSU (197.600), Alabama (197.550), Georgia (197.100), Nebraska (196.500)

Individual Event Finals
Individual Event Finals: Birmingham–Jefferson Convention Complex, Birmingham, Alabama, on Sunday, April 20, 2014. (2 p.m. CST)
 Vault – 1st Katherine Grable, Arkansas & Rheagan Courville, LSU (9.9750); 3rd Haley Scaman, Oklahoma (9.9667)
 Uneven Bars – 1st Bridget Sloan, Florida (9.9375); 2nd Samantha Shapiro, Stanford (9.9250); 3rd Kristina Vaculik, Stanford (9.9000)
 Balance Beam – 1st Taylor Spears, Oklahoma (9.925); 2nd Lindsey Cheek, Georgia (9.900); 3rd Madeline Gardiner, Oregon State & Mary Beth Box, Georgia & Sydney Ewing, LSU & Jamie Schleppenbach, Nebraska (9.8875)
 Floor Exercise – 1st Katherine Grable, Arkansas (9.9625); 2nd Joanna Sampson, Michigan & Maileana Kanewa, Oklahoma & Haley Scaman, Oklahoma (9.950) 
 All Around – 1st Kim Jacob, Alabama, 39.625; 2nd Katherine Grable, Arkansas & Alaina Johnson, Florida 39.600

Champions

References

External links
 NCAA Gymnastics Championship official site

NCAA Women's Gymnastics championship
2014 in American sports
2014 in sports in Alabama
2014 in gymnastics
NCAA Women's Gymnastics Championship